Lyons Hall is a Grade II listed house in Great Leighs, Essex. The house dates to the 15th century. The house has been home to the Tritton banking family for many years, and Joseph Herbert Tritton died there in 1923.

References

Grade II listed houses
Grade II listed buildings in Essex
Tritton family
Great Leighs